"Squats" is a song credited to Oh Snap! and Bombs Away. The song was released digitally on 10 April 2015. The song peaked at number 69 on the Australian ARIA Charts.

Reception
Sights and Sound magazine said "Calling on Baltimore based rapper and MC to add more than just a dash of vocal energy to proceedings, 'Squats' moves along with driving bass, and its ass-shaking melodies that are given a boost by the rowdy rhymes of Oh Snap!." adding "Shouting out all the ladies in the dance who know how to get low, this pumping anthem is feel good from start to finish."

Track listing
Digital download
 "Squats" (Original Radio Edit) – 3:35

Digital download (Remixes)
 "Squats" (Kronic & Oski Remix) – 3:13
 "Squats" (Klaus Hill 'Fidget Flashback' Remix) – 4:35
 "Squats" (Bounce Inc. Remix) – 3:52
 "Squats" (Social Hooliganz Remix) – 4:51
 "Squats" (Oh Snap! Remix) – 3:01
 "Squats" (Sarah Robertson 'Future House' Remix) – 4:07
 "Squats" (Lefty Remix) – 4:25
 "Squats" (Dan Absent Remix) – 4:02
 "Squats" (Raynor Bruges Remix) – 2:55
 "Squats" (Prism Sound Remix) – 3:23
 "Squats" (Liam Turner Remix) – 4:22

Charts

Release History

References

2015 singles
2015 songs
Bombs Away (group) songs
Shock Records singles